Zemianska Olča is a village and municipality in the Komárno District in the Nitra Region of south-west Slovakia.

Geography 
The village lies at an altitude of 113 metres and covers an area of 27.942 km².
It has a population of about 2,600 people.

History 
In the 9th century, the territory of Zemianska Olča became part of the Kingdom of Hungary. In historical records the village was first mentioned in 1247.
After the Austro-Hungarian army disintegrated in November 1918, Czechoslovak troops occupied the area, later acknowledged internationally by the Treaty of Trianon. Between 1938 and 1945 Zemianska Olča once more  became part of Miklós Horthy's Hungary through the First Vienna Award. From 1945 until the Velvet Divorce, it was part of Czechoslovakia. Since then it has been part of Slovakia.

Demographics 
The village is about 90% Hungarian, and 9% Slovak.

Facilities 
The village has a public library, a gym and a football pitch.

Villages and municipalities in the Komárno District
Hungarian communities in Slovakia